Events in the year 1872 in Portugal.

Incumbents
Monarch: Louis I
Prime Minister: Fontes Pereira de Melo

Events

Arts and entertainment

Sports

Births

2 February – Tomé de Barros Queirós, trader and politician (died 1925)
1 May – Sidónio Pais, politician and diplomat (died 1918).
 18 June – Ana de Castro Osório, writer, journalist, feminist and republican activist (died 1935)

Deaths

References

 
1870s in Portugal
Years of the 19th century in Portugal
Portugal